

Current arenas

Future/proposed arenas

Former arenas

Former teams

Neutral venues, selected/ special games

References

External links

 
Kontinental Hockey League